is a freeware horror game  developed by "noprops". It was first released in Japan in November 2008. The game was later adapted into a series of light novels and manga by Kenji Kuroda.

Plot
The story follows a boy named Hiroshi, who along with his school friends, investigates a deserted mansion that is rumored to be haunted. Upon entering the mansion, the group discovers that it is home to a mysterious creature referred to as the Ao Oni (青鬼 in Japanese, literally "Blue Demon") a tall humanoid with a deformed face that proceeds to chase the player throughout the mansion. The player must solve a series of puzzles while evading the creature to escape the mansion.

There are four different versions of the game, each with their own puzzles, maps and endings. Only the two latest versions have been officially translated.

The Ao Oni or Blue Demon

Very little information is explained in the game about the Oni and his reasons for inhabiting the mansion, but it is assumed that he may have been one of the mansion's old residents. The Oni is a muscular, tall humanoid with a large head and blue skin who is roughly twice the size of an average human. When he appears in the game, a characteristic "shrieking" string chord plays until the player outruns him.

Normally, his mouth is kept closed in an amused smirk, but in a secret ending he is shown to have a set of sharp, knife-like teeth. If the Oni captures and kills one of Hiroshi's friends, they too turn into an Oni, distinguishable by their hairstyles, which they kept when transformed by the Oni.

In addition to the standard Oni, the player can enter an "Oni Room", containing numerous deformed, mutated, and completely original Onis, including a rectangular oni called "Blockman", who resembles the popular Japanese character Domo-kun, and a gigantic, muscle-bound Oni nicknamed "Squatto", who humorously appears to be hefting invisible weights when encountered for the first time. Both of these Onis can chase the player more than once if the player enters their names when creating a new game.

Gameplay
The player controls Hiroshi as he explores the locked mansion, gathering items and solving puzzles in order to escape.

The creature (the Ao Oni) will begin to chase the player at both random and scripted moments, similar to the Nemesis in Resident Evil 3. This forces the player to evade the Oni by either outrunning him or hiding from him, since Hiroshi is unable to fight back against him.

Media

Novels

Novelizations 
In 2013 - 2017, a series of novels were released which were based on the game. Slight differences to the storyline, mostly based on characterization are present, but the books are otherwise faithful to the game's plot. The title was licensed for digital distribution in the English language by J-Novel Club. The series is made up of five novels, which J-Novel Club released between 2018 and 2019: Ao Oni, Ao Oni: Vengeance, Ao Oni: Mutation, Ao Oni: Grudge, and Ao Oni: Forever.

Junior novels 
In 2018 PHP Laboratory began publishing a series of junior novels based on the Ao Oni series. The series follows the game characters, who are of elementary school age instead of teenagers, and is told from the perspective of a stray dog that was taken in by Takuro's uncle.

 『青鬼 ジェイルハウスの怪物』(2018, lit. Ao Oni The Jailhouse Monster)
 『青鬼 廃校の亡霊』 (2018, lit. Ao Oni The Ghost in the Abandoned School)
 『青鬼 真夜中の地下病棟』 (2018, lit. Ao Oni The Midnight Underground Ward)
 『青鬼 ドクロ島からの脱出』(2019, lit. Escape from the Ao Oni Skull Island)
 『青鬼 ゾンビだらけの遊園地』 (2019, lit. Ao Oni Zombie Amusement Park)
 『青鬼 調査クラブ ジェイルハウスの怪物を倒せ!』 (2019, lit. Ao Oni Demon Research Club Defeat the Monsters of Jailhouse!)

Live-action film

Ao Oni was adapted into a live action film of the same name, that was released in Japan on 5 July 2014.

Anime
An anime television short series adaptation premiered on 3 October 2016. The series is produced by Studio Deen, and directed by Toshirō Hamamura and Chisei Maeda, with Kanekoke handling series composition, Kichi designing the characters and Shiyu Yanagida composing the music. An anime film, also produced by Studio Deen, released in 2017.

Reception

The game gained a cult following online in Japan, gaining notoriety through websites such as Niconico and YouTube where Ao Oni-related videos exceeded 50 million views by 2013. The popularity of the game revolves around the effectiveness of its horror aspects despite being a simple game, with the background music cited as a key contributor to the chilling atmosphere used to incite fear.

References

External links
  at noprops 
  
  

2008 video games
Doujin video games
Windows games
Windows-only games
2000s horror video games
RPG Maker games
Studio Deen
Video games about demons
Video games about insects
Video games adapted into films
Video games adapted into comics
Video games adapted into television shows
Video games developed in Japan
Works set in country houses
J-Novel Club books